A list of films produced in France in 1998.

References

External links
 French films of 1998 at the Internet Movie Database
French films of 1998 at Cinema-francais.fr

1998
Films
French